Saale-Holzland-Kreis II is an electoral constituency (German: Wahlkreis) represented in the Landtag of Thuringia. It elects one member via first-past-the-post voting. Under the current constituency numbering system, it is designated as constituency 36. It covers the northern part of Saale-Holzland-Kreis.

Saale-Holzland-Kreis II was created for the 1994 state election. Since 2009, it has been represented by Mario Voigt of the Christian Democratic Union (CDU).

Geography
As of the 2019 state election, Saale-Holzland-Kreis II covers the northern part of Saale-Holzland-Kreis, specifically the municipalities of Albersdorf, Bad Klosterlausnitz, Bobeck, Bürgel, Crossen an der Elster, Dornburg-Camburg, Eisenberg, Frauenprießnitz, Golmsdorf, Gösen, Graitschen b. Bürgel, Großlöbichau, Hainichen, Hainspitz, Hartmannsdorf, Heideland, Jenalöbnitz, Lehesten, Löberschütz, Mertendorf, Nausnitz, Neuengönna, Petersberg, Poxdorf, Rauda, Rauschwitz, Scheiditz, Schkölen, Schlöben, Schöngleina, Serba, Silbitz, Tautenburg, Tautenhain, Thierschneck, Waldeck, Walpernhain, Weißenborn, Wichmar, and Zimmern.

Members
The constituency has been held by the Christian Democratic Union since its creation in 1994. Its first representative was Konrad Illing, who served from 1994 to 2004, followed by Wieland Rose (2004–2009) and Mario Voigt (2009–present).

Election results

2019 election

2014 election

2009 election

2004 election

1999 election

1994 election

References

Electoral districts in Thuringia
1994 establishments in Germany
Saale-Holzland-Kreis
Constituencies established in 1994